The Byrte Power Station  is a hydroelectric power station located near the lake Byrtevatn in the municipality Tokke in Vestfold og Telemark, Norway.

See also

References 

Hydroelectric power stations in Norway
Buildings and structures in Vestfold og Telemark
Tokke